Craig "Chi" Kredell (born February 16, 1971) is an American water polo player. He competed in the men's tournament at the 2000 Summer Olympics.

References

External links
 

1971 births
Living people
American male water polo players
Olympic water polo players of the United States
Water polo players at the 2000 Summer Olympics
Sportspeople from Long Beach, California
Water polo players at the 1995 Pan American Games
Pan American Games gold medalists for the United States
Pan American Games medalists in water polo